Fukuhara (written: 福原) is a Japanese surname meaning "field of fortune", "field of blessings", or "lucky field". Alternate transliterations include Fukubara and Fukuwara. Notable people with the surname include:

Aaron Fukuhara (born 1991), American judoka
, Japanese table tennis player
, Japanese pharmacist and businessman
, Japanese voice actress
Harry K. Fukuhara (1920–2015), United States Army soldier
, Japanese actress, voice actress and singer
Henry Fukuhara (1913–2010), American watercolorist
, Japanese samurai
, Japanese cyclist
, Japanese voice actress
Karen Fukuhara (born 1992), American actress
, Japanese singer
, Japanese figure skater
, Japanese footballer
, Japanese photographer
, Japanese baseball player
, Japanese photographer
, Japanese boxer
, Japanese alpine skier

Fictional characters
, a character in the light novel series Baka and Test

See also
Fukuhara-kyō, one time seat of the Japanese Imperial Court
Fukuhara Station, a railway station in Kasama, Ibaraki Prefecture, Japan
8043 Fukuhara, a main-belt asteroid

Japanese-language surnames